Bali is a town and a municipality in Pali district in the state of Rajasthan, India. 
The town is situated on the left bank of the Mithari River. This walled town was the headquarters of a district having the same name in the Jodhpur State. Bali is a tehsil and panchayat samiti with the same name. Bali is also a sub-divisions among the 10 sub-divisions of the Pali district. It is known for its fort. Nearest towns are Falna & Sadri and nearest villages are Shri Sela and Boya.

Geography

Bali is located at  near the Aravalli Range. It is a constituency of Pali district. It has an average elevation of 298 metres (977 feet). In the easts 7 km from Bali. The nearest airport is Udaipur.

Administration

Bali is represented in the center under Pali (Lok Sabha constituency), while in state it is represented under the Bali (Rajasthan Assembly constituency). Present MLA is Mr. Pushpendra Singh Ranawat.  It is a municipality of class IV. There are 25 wards for the municipality. Presently Bali has BJP board and Chairperson is Mr. Bharat.

Demographics
 India census, Bali had a population of 19,880. Males constitute 50.67% (10,007) of the population and females 49.33% (9,873). Bali has an average literacy rate of 64.28%, lower than the national average of 74.04%; with 74.51% of the males and 53.91% of females literate. 11.72% of the population is under 6 years of age. In 1897 its population was about 6000. The majority of population of Bali consists of Jain and Marwadi community, which is also the most prosperous community. However most members of this community have settled elsewhere in India, where they carry out business and visit their ancestral town mostly to perform marriages in the family.

The Bali Assembly constituency is one of the six Rajasthan Legislative Assembly constituencies in Pali district. In the past, it has also elected the former Chief Minister Bhairon Singh Shekhawat as their MLA in 1993 and 1998.

As a tehsil
Bali tehsil has 93 villages under 39 gram panchayats and two municipalities, Falna and itself. Gram Panchayats are Amaliya, Barwa, Bedal, Bera, Bhandar, Bhatund, Bheetwara, Bhimana, Bijapur, shri sela, Bisalpur, Boya, Chamunderi, Dhani-Sela, Doodni, Falna Gaon, Goriya, Guralas, Kakardi, Khimel, Kotbaliyan, Kothar, Koyalwao, Kumtiya, sandla, Kuran, Latara, Lunawa, Lundara, Malnoo, Mirgeshwar, Mokampura, Mundara, Nana, Paderla, Peepla, Perwa, Sena, Sesli, Sewari and Shivtalao. The tehsil has an area of about 1304.26 square kilometres.

Population of the tehsil is 2,23,027 (2001 census). Out of which 1,83,802 is rural while 39,225 is urban. Male constitutes 1,11,572 and female population is 1,11,455. The tehsil has a good population of tribes.

Bali Fort 

A major attraction of town is Bali Fort. The fort currently houses the prison and most of the other buildings are in ruins. One can have a scenic view of surroundings from the top of the fort. Maharao Ajitsingot was the fourth son of the Maharao Lakhansi (Nadol), he came to the Mithdi River in AD 1231 and then he saw a rock and wanted to create a fort and created a temple of Bolmata as a kuldevi of his royal family, after that his Son Vijaysingot also helped in creation, after his death his son Maharao Balaji completed a fort and in his name this place is called "Bali" and founded the balecha sub-clan of chouhan clan.

The junction (Chowk) outside the Bali Fort is now named as Freedom Fighter Chotmal Surana Chowk after Late Freedom Fighter Chotmal Surana for his contribution towards India Independence Movement. The Inauguration of Chowk was done by then Governor of Gujarat Dr. Kamla Beniwal on 1 March 2011. Dr. Beniwal unveiled the statue of Late Chotmal Surana. A huge public program was said to be conducted which was joined by the entire village and is described as one of the biggest ceremonies held in the village. The event was hosted by Bali Municipal Corporation along with the Family Members of Late Freedom Fighter Chotmal Surana.

Festivals
Several festivals are celebrated in Bali with great vigor. Most prominent is that of Sitala Mata that is celebrated in March, where peasants dance in the fort of Bali. The other main festivals are Gangaur and Pashu mela.
One of another big festival is Bhadra Beej celebrated by Marwadi Seervi community.

Industries Working
Situated in the heart of Pali district, Bali has outstretched its reach in many industries. Prominent hospitals, IT start ups, Manufacturing units, ethnic handicraft units and FMCG factories engage the population of the city.

Delicacies 
Bali is known for its sweet dish Sutarfeni - within Rajasthan, Bali's Sutarfeni is said to be the finest.

Education
The main school is Govt High Secondary. the School provides science, commerce, and art stream education. A government science college was established here in 2013.
The Fabindia School was established here in 1992, which is today a co-educational, senior secondary school with 1000 students including 40% girls.

References

Cities and towns in Pali district